Otto Behaghel (May 3, 1854 in Karlsruhe – October 9, 1936 in Munich) was a germanist and professor in Heidelberg, Basel, and Gießen.

He added theoretical contributions to the German and Middle High German language. He formulated Behaghel's laws. His work is still important in Theme and rheme research.

Works
 Geschichte der deutschen Sprache (1891)
 Heliand und Genesis (1903)
 Deutsche Syntax, 3 volumes (1923–1928)

1854 births
1936 deaths
Germanic studies scholars
Linguists of Germanic languages
Members of the Göttingen Academy of Sciences and Humanities